Cyperus friburgensis is a species of sedge that is endemic to parts of South America.

The species was first formally described by the botanist Johann Otto Boeckeler in 1890.

See also
 List of Cyperus species

References

friburgensis
Taxa named by Johann Otto Boeckeler
Plants described in 1890
Flora of Argentina
Flora of Bolivia
Flora of Brazil
Flora of Peru